Patrick Condell (born 23 November 1949) is a British writer, polemicist, and former stand-up comedian. In his early career, he wrote and performed in alternative comedy shows during the 1980s and 1990s in London, winning the Time Out Comedy Award in 1991. He was also a regular panelist on BBC Radio 1's Loose Talk programme.

In early 2007 he began uploading to the internet short filmed monologue polemics primarily about religious authority, authoritarianism in government and left-wing politics, and the societal effects of Muslim immigration into Europe, which have featured on the front pages of websites such as YouTube and LiveLeak. They have also been published on DVD, and also as a book of video transcripts. As of June 2017, Condell's YouTube channel has over a third of a million subscribers, with over 70 million views.

Early life
Condell was born in Dublin on 23 November 1949. He was raised in England as a Catholic. His father was a compulsive gambler working in a betting shop until he was sent to prison for stealing money; he subsequently died of leukaemia. The Condell family in consequence was impoverished, moving repeatedly from home to home. Condell was educated in several different Church of England schools in South London, saying of this time, "I found myself segregated in assembly and shunted into another room while everyone said their morning prayers. The whole pantomime seemed hollow to me even then. Once you become aware of the gulf between what people profess to believe and how they actually behave, it's hard to take any of it seriously."

Condell left school at 16. His first job was as a dish-washer in the revolving restaurant on top of the Post Office Tower, now known as the BT Tower in London, for five shillings an hour. He became a vegetarian in 1976 after watching a deer being butchered. Condell did a number of jobs including working in a furniture warehouse, as a welder at the Ford Transit plant in Southampton, as an office clerk for a shipping company, volunteering on a kibbutz in Israel and then doing six years of logging in Canada.

Comedy
After moving back to the United Kingdom from Canada, Condell performed alternative comedy shows during the 1980s and 1990s. His first performance on stage was at the age of 32 in a comedy sketch called Mountbatten's Plimsoll. He also wrote poetry and appeared in the Poetry Olympics at the Young Vic Theatre in 1982, which led to a job writing weekly poems for the Time Out magazine. Condell was described at the time as "a manic gimlet-eyed, crop-haired poet" in Drama: The Quarterly Theatre Review book. He then performed on the London alternative comedy circuit for several years (originally under the name Eddie Zibin). He also performed at the Tunnel Club, next to the Blackwall Tunnel, where he describes the audience as a "nightmare;" bottles and glasses were thrown at him, and one person attempted to cut the microphone lead with a pair of garden shears. Condell was a performer at The Comedy Store in the Cutting Edge team, with whom he performed at the Edinburgh Fringe in 1991.
That year Condell was the winner of a Time Out Comedy Award.

From 1991 to 1994 Condell was a regular panellist on BBC Radio 1's Loose Talk. During the mid-1990s, he was performing over 200 times a year. Due to the late nights and regular travelling he decided to start writing for other comedians, while still doing the occasional performance. In 1991 he performed comedy sketches with other comedians at the Duke of York's Theatre in a show put on to raise funds for Amnesty.

Condell's 1996 play Barry Sorts It Out was given a negative review in the Financial Times, which described it as "a sordid East End comedy" which "repeats ad nauseam the same gag." The reviewer concluded that it is "a play with all the bite of a set of joke-shop fangs."

His 2006 stand-up show Faith Hope and Sanity, subtitled "A Few Jokes About Religion Before It Kills Us All," was a platform for his comedy and atheist beliefs. "This is the first time I've set out to write a show in order to say something, rather than just as a vehicle for stand-up" he said of the show. He performed the show at London's Etcetera Theatre. Chortle gave Condell's 2006 show a negative review, noting that Condell is covering familiar territory but "is not quite up to the job," and observing that Condell's material was delivered "with very little variation in pace or tone, ... with the feel of a lecture" and "no structure, no building up to a passionate, climactic conclusion, no ebb and flow of storytelling." Chortle concluded that "Condell is still going through the motions."

Online videos and politics
Condell had posted more than 100 video monologues on various video sites as of August 2011, which together had notched up over 35 million hits, Eight of his videos are in the top hundred most commented on videos in the UK. Most of his YouTube videos chastise Islam and Western appeasement of Islam. His videos have caused Condell to receive hundreds of death threats but also a significant amount of support.

Condell has spoken favourably of Dutch politician Geert Wilders and has described the Qur'an as hate speech. Condell has been described as part of the counter-jihad movement.

Condell's first video, uploaded to YouTube on 8 February 2007 was his participation in The Blasphemy Challenge, an Internet-based project which aims to get atheists to declare themselves. The challenge asks atheists to submit videos to the website YouTube, in which they record themselves blaspheming or denying the existence of the Holy Spirit.

Atheism
Richard Dawkins, author of The God Delusion, said of Condell that "Pat Condell is unique. Nobody can match his extraordinary blend of suavity and savagery. With his articulate intelligence he runs rings around the religious wingnuts that are the targets of his merciless humour. Thank goodness he is on our side". In 2008, Dawkins's website released a collection of Condell's monologues on DVD, titled Pat Condell: Anthology.

In 2007, he was criticised by Christian author Dinesh D'Souza on AOL News, who said "If the televangelists are guilty of producing some simple-minded, self-righteous Christians, then the atheist authors are guilty of producing self-congratulatory buffoons like Condell." The book Raising Freethinkers: A Practical Guide for Parenting Beyond Belief, describes Condell as "breathtakingly intelligent, articulate, uncompromising, and funny". The New York Times Magazine described Condell as a "smug atheist".

Condell is a member of the National Secular Society.

No Mosque at Ground Zero

Condell opposed the development of Park51, near the site of 11 September 2001 World Trade Center attack, in lower Manhattan. On 4 June 2010, he released a video titled "No Mosque at Ground Zero", in which he said that it was representative of Islamic triumphalism and that the United States would soon be on the verge of Islamization and have its freedoms trimmed, as he said Europe has. Additionally, Condell cast doubt over the funding of the community centre, and claimed that Islam would have been banned in the civilised world if it wasn't a religion. He compared the system of Sharia and the Muslims who endorse it to Nazi Germany.

The Trouble with Islam reaction

Condell also received criticism after links to his monologue titled The Trouble with Islam were circulated to commissioners in the California city of Berkeley's Peace and Justice Commission. Condell said in the video that Islam is "a religion of war", that "Muslim women in Britain who cover their faces are mentally ill", though in some parts of the world women have no choice but to cover their face, as they are "governed...by primitive pigs whose only achievement in life is to be born with a penis in one hand and a Qur'an in the other". Commissioner Elliot Cohen described Condell's comments as "insulting, degenerating and racist".

Condell then accused Cohen of being "motivated by his own narrow personal and political agenda which has nothing to do with [Condell] or the video clip". The video was initially sent to them by fellow Peace and Justice Commissioner Jonathan Wornick, who said it "tries to expose intolerance in the Muslim world", such as "the intolerance of radical Islamists who say if you insult Allah, you should have your head cut off". Condell said that its popularity proves "there is an enthusiastic audience for comedy ideas and opinions which are routinely censored out of existence in the UK’s mainstream media, thanks to misguided political correctness".

YouTube video removals

Condell's video Welcome to Saudi Britain was removed by YouTube early in October 2008, but reinstated shortly after. In it Condell criticises Britain's sanctioning of a Sharia court, and refers to the entire country of Saudi Arabia as "mentally ill" for its abuse of women.

A YouTube spokesman said "YouTube has clear policies that prohibit inappropriate content on the site, such as pornography, gratuitous violence or hate speech.... If users repeatedly break these rules we disable their accounts." The National Secular Society was among the complainants to YouTube, saying "as usual, he (Condell) does not mince his words, but he is not saying anything that is untrue. His main thrust is one of outrage on behalf of those Muslim women who will suffer because they are forced to have their marital problems solved in a male-dominated Sharia court."

Shortly after, YouTube reversed its earlier decision, saying, "Upon further review of the context of Pat Condell's comments, we've reinstated it." Richard Dawkins applauded the reversal, saying "I congratulate YouTube on an excellent decision. Pat Condell is hard-hitting, but always quietly reasonable in tone." Condell believed that it was removed due to a flagging campaign by Islamic activists.

YouTube also briefly removed Condell's video Godless and Free but then restored it, emailing Condell and explaining that it had been removed erroneously.

Works

See also

Criticism of Islamism
Criticism of religion
List of comedians
New Atheism
Pacifism
Social impact of YouTube

References

External links

 
 

1949 births
20th-century atheists
21st-century atheists
Irish male comedians
British atheism activists
Free speech activists
British Internet celebrities
British podcasters
English stand-up comedians
English male comedians
English political commentators
English bloggers
English expatriates in Canada
English humanists
English satirists
English sceptics
Former Roman Catholics
Irish emigrants to the United Kingdom
British social commentators
Secular humanists
Living people
Anti-Islam sentiment in the United Kingdom
English video bloggers
British religious sceptics
British YouTubers
Articles containing video clips
English male dramatists and playwrights
British critics of Islam
Counter-jihad activists
Critics of multiculturalism
Male critics of feminism
Critics of creationism
British male bloggers
Commentary YouTubers
20th-century Irish comedians
21st-century Irish comedians